Çataklı can refer to:

 Çataklı, Alacakaya
 Çataklı, Ceyhan